Love You Zindagi is a 2019 Marathi movie starring Sachin Pilgaonkar, Prarthana Behere, and Kavita Lad. This movie is presented and produced by Sachin Bamgude and presented by SP Productions.

Cast
Sachin Pilgaonkar
Prarthana Behere
Kavita Lad
Atul Parchure
Samir Choughule

Reception
This movie got 3 Stars from  The Times of India.

Music

References

2010s Marathi-language films